Events in the year 1698 in Norway.

Incumbents
Monarch: Christian V

Events

Arts and literature

The construction of Mangelsgården is finished.

Births
 Ulrik Fredrik de Cicignon, military officer (d.1772)

Deaths

See also

References